Nam Cheong Street is a street in Shek Kip Mei and Sham Shui Po, Sham Shui Po District, Kowloon, Hong Kong. It begins in the north at Lung Ping Road and Yan Ping Road in Shek Kip Mei and terminates in the south at Tung Chau Street and Boundary Street in Sham Shui Po.

Name
Nam Cheong Street takes its name from Nanchang, a city in China. Most streets in Sham Shui Po are named after Chinese cities.

There are speculations about its origins. One of them suggest that it may had been from Chan Nam Chong. A section of Nam Cheong Street at Ki Lung Street has wholesale, retail, ribbon, and zipper shops. Therefore, it is called lace street.

Parkone, Nam Cheong Estate, Nam Cheong station, Nam Cheong Place (formerly Fu Cheong Shopping Centre ) and Nam Cheong Park are all named after the street. Apart from Parkone, all of these features are located south of the southern end of Nam Cheong Street.

History
Nam Cheong Street was laid out in the 1920s.

Overview 
Nam Cheong street features many old Chinese-style buildings and shops. From Un Chau Street to Tung Chau Street, there are only six parking spots among its two lanes.

The section from Wai Lun Street to Cornwall Street is a big slope. There is also a Transport Department center at Nam Cheong Street.

Redevelopment 
Developers had already acquired or own tenement buildings/tong lau and would demolished them and turn them into luxury residential or commercial buildings. Buildings currently under construction are Parkone, Nam Cheong Street and Berwick Street and Yiu Tung Street etc. The view of the street has changed over time.

Features
Features from south to north include:
 Park One (#1)
 14 Nam Cheong Street (#14)
 117-125 Nam Cheong Street (#117-125). A row of tong lau listed as Grade III historic buildings.
No. 117 houses a pawnshop named Nam Cheong Pawnshop
 Shek Kip Mei Estate
 Pak Tin Ambulance Depot. At the corner with Pak Wan Street
 Pak Tin Estate
 Shek Kip Mei Park
 Tung Wah Group of Hospitals Chang Ming Thien College (#300)
 Shek Kip Mei Fire Station (#380)

Intersections  

Intersections from south to north:
Tung Chau Street
Boundary Street
Hai Tan Street
Yee Kuk Street
Lai Chi Kok Road
Tai Nan Street
Ki Lung Street
Yu Chau Street
Apliu Street
Cheung Sha Wan Road
Fuk Wah Street
Fuk Wing Street
Un Chau Street
Tai Po Road
Yiu Tung Street
Berwick Street
Woh Chai Street
Wai Chi Street
Wai Lun Street
Tai Hang Sai Street
Pak Wan Street
Chak On Road S
Lung Yuet Road
Tai Po Road
Ching Cheung Road
Chak On Road
Lung Ping Road
Tai Woh Ping Road
Lung Cheung Road

In popular culture 
"The Prince Near You" is a song by Fiona Sit. The composer and writer is Lam-ka Him and Wyman Wong respectively. There are not a lot of new buildings in this street. Most are tenements or tong lau. This is why The Prince in Nam Cheong Street may not live in a castle.

See also
 List of streets and roads in Hong Kong

References 

Roads in New Kowloon
Shek Kip Mei
Sham Shui Po